Draba aretioides is a species of flowering plant in the family Brassicaceae. It is found only in Ecuador. Its natural habitat is rocky areas. Cushion forming herb, on soil formed from calcareous rock. Foliage grayish-green. Flowers white to yellowish.

References

aretioides
Flora of Ecuador
Endangered plants
Taxonomy articles created by Polbot